The Captain William Lucas and Robert Lucas House, also known as Linden Spring, is a large stone house near Shepherdstown in Jefferson County, West Virginia, United States.  It was built circa 1783 for Captain William Lucas, a Revolutionary War soldier.  Lucas' son, Robert Lucas was born here and became a Governor of Ohio and the first Territorial governor of Iowa.

William Lucas was the son of Edward Lucas II, who arrived in Jefferson County in 1732 and received lands from Thomas Fairfax, 6th Lord Fairfax of Cameron.  William's wife was Susannah Barnes, sister-in-law to James Rumsey, whose steamship experiments took place on the nearby Potomac River.

References

Houses on the National Register of Historic Places in West Virginia
Lucas, William
Robert Lucas family
National Register of Historic Places in Jefferson County, West Virginia
Houses completed in 1793
Georgian architecture in West Virginia
Stone houses in West Virginia